Asael Lubotzky (born 21 January 1983) is an Israeli physician, author, and molecular biologist. Formerly he served as an IDF officer and is a combat veteran of the Second Lebanon War.

Military service
Asael Lubotzky grew up in Efrat, studied at the Hesder yeshiva in Ma'ale Adumim, was accepted to Shayetet 13, but chose to enlist in Golani's 51st Battalion. He underwent a training course as a combat soldier and was chosen as the outstanding company cadet. After completing Officer Candidate School Asael served as an officer commanding a platoon of the Golani Brigade. He led his platoon in the fighting in Gaza and, during the Second Lebanon War, fought in many battles in which many of his comrades were killed and wounded, until his own severe injury in the Battle of Bint Jbeil left him with a disability.

Medical and research career
After rehabilitation from the injury, he began studying medicine at the Hebrew University Hadassah Medical School, qualified as a doctor, and specialized in pediatrics at the Shaare Zedek Hospital in Jerusalem.
He joined the lab of professor Haim Cedar and became a PhD student of Professor Yuval Dor and Ruth Shemer at the Hebrew University's Department of Developmental Biology and Cancer Research, who works on methylation patterns of circulating cell-free DNA (cfDNA). Lubotzky was recognized for his studies on circulating cfDNA as cancer diagnostic markers, received the Israel Cancer Research Fund (ICRF) cancer grant and in 2019 was awarded The James Sivartsen Prize in Cancer Research by The Hebrew University for his innovative work in the field of cancer research. In 2020 his research team received a prestigious grant of $500,000 from the Bill & Melinda Gates Foundation and Alzheimer's Drug Discovery Foundation towards their research on early diagnosis of Alzheimer's disease based on blood tests. 
In 2021 he received the Joint Award of the National Institute of Psychobiology in Israel (NIPI) and the Israeli Society of Biological Psychiatry. 

In 2021 he was awarded a PhD for a thesis entitled: "Liquid Biopsies Reveal Collateral Tissue Damage in Cancer and Brain Damage in Neural Pathologies". The work demonstrated that metastatic tumors caused collateral tissue damage that released cfDNA from affected organs and that cell-free DNA methylation patterns can reveal the presence of metastases and offer clues to their tissue location. 

In 2022 he won The Rothschild Fellowship for young scholars of outstanding academic merit.

In a research published in 2022, Lubotzky and colleagues discovered that brain cells die in a psychotic attack. They demonstrated a higher level of brain-derived cell-free DNA in patients who experienced psychotic symptoms compared to healthy controls. The finding would serve as a proof of concept for brain-derived cell-free DNA as biomarkers of psychosis.

Writing
Lubotzky's first book, From the Wilderness and Lebanon, describing his experiences in war and his rehabilitation, was published in 2008 by Yedioth Ahronoth, became a best-seller, won critical acclaim and was translated into English. A second book, Not My Last Journey, documenting the life story of his grandfather, the partisan and Irgun officer Iser Lubotzky, was published in Hebrew in 2017 by Yedioth Books and Menachem Begin Heritage Center.

Lubotzky won the Leitersdorf Prize for the Arts for 2017. Lubotzky lectures on various topics in Israel and abroad.

Personal life
Asael Lubotzky is the son of Prof. Alex Lubotzky and grandson of Prof. Murray Roston. He lives in Jerusalem, is married to Avital (Schimmel), a medical psychologist and they have five children.

Books
  (Min HaMidbar VeHaLevanon), Yedioth Ahronoth, 2008
 From the Wilderness and Lebanon, The Toby Press, Koren Publishers Jerusalem, 2016. English translation of the previous book by professor Murray Roston
  (Not My Last Journey), Yedioth Ahronoth & Menachem Begin Heritage Center, 2017

External links
 Dr. Asael Lubotzky, Koren Publishers Jerusalem
 Dr. Asael Lubotzy, MD, PhD, Hebrew University, Alzheimer's Drug Discovery Foundation, 2021
 Dr. Asael Lubotzky, MD Hebrew University of Jerusalem, Israel Cancer Research Fund
 Dr. Asael Lubotzky, Rohr Jewish Learning Institute
 Devastating war injury turns Israeli soldier into best-selling author and doctor, Jewish Telegraphic Agency, Larry Luxner. November 18, 2018.

References

1983 births
2006 Lebanon War
Jewish physicians
Living people
Jewish writers
Israeli writers
The Hebrew University-Hadassah Medical School alumni
Israeli people with disabilities
Israeli pediatricians
Hebrew-language writers
Israeli soldiers
Autobiographers